Richland Y is an unincorporated community in Benton County, Washington, United States. It lies within the eastern city limits of Richland.

References

Unincorporated communities in Benton County, Washington
Northern Pacific Railway
Unincorporated communities in Washington (state)
Populated places on the Yakima River
Washington (state) populated places on the Columbia River